Kraków Gate is one of the few rock gates in Ojców National Park. It is in the Valley of the Pradnik and closes the outlet of the Cracow Gorge Gateway to the valley. It is a classic example of the gates of rock. The name derives from the fact that once led the way trade route from Krakow to Silesia.

In 1928, it was laid on the memorial plaque on the occasion of the construction of a new road from Krakow to Ojcow, running the bottom of the Pradnik Valley, but because of the protests of environmentalists array removed in 1935.

Bibliography 
 Dolinki Podkrakowskie. Mapa turystyczna 1:25 000. Kraków: Wyd. Compass, 2006. .
 Józef Partyka: Ojcowski Park Narodowy: przewodnik turystyczny. Warszawa: Sport i Turystyka Muza SA, 2006. .

Rock formations of Poland